Frederick Douglass High School is an alternative public high school located in Columbia, Missouri.  Douglass enrolls students 9-12 from throughout the Columbia Public Schools District. The school competes in MSHSAA 4A. Their sports include basketball and track and field. The school differs from typical high schools due to providing programs including child development and parenting classes and a day care facility. It was built in 1917, and is a two-story, Classical Revival style brick building on a raised basement. The building was listed on the National Register of Historic Places in 1980 as Fred Douglass School. Recently, it was closed, restored, and modernized, reopening in the Fall of 2017. It is one of four High Schools in the Columbia Public School District.

References

Educational institutions established in 1916
Schools in Columbia, Missouri
African-American history in Columbia, Missouri
High schools in Boone County, Missouri
School buildings on the National Register of Historic Places in Missouri
Neoclassical architecture in Missouri
School buildings completed in 1917
National Register of Historic Places in Boone County, Missouri
African-American history of Missouri
Historically segregated African-American schools in Missouri
1917 establishments in Missouri